Gallant Defender is a 1935 American Western film directed by David Selman and starring Charles Starrett.

Plot
Roving cowboy is involved in struggle between homesteaders and cattle ranchers.

Cast
 Charles Starrett as Johnny Flagg
 Joan Perry as Barbara McGrail
 Harry Woods as Barr Munro
 Edward LeSaint as Harvey Campbell (as Edward J. LeSaint)
 Jack Rube Clifford as Sheriff (as Jack Clifford)
 Al Bridge	as Salty Smith (as Al Bridges)
 Georgie Billings as Jimmy McGrail (as George Billings)
 George Chesebro as Joe Swale
 Sons of the Pioneers as Musicians

See also
 List of American films of 1935

External links
 

1935 films
1930s English-language films
1935 Western (genre) films
American black-and-white films
Columbia Pictures films
American Western (genre) films
Films directed by David Selman
1930s American films